This is a list of Romanian-American organizations.

Business
Romanian-American Center Focus Publishing, Publisher of the Romanian-American Yellow Pages and Romanian Impact Magazine 
Romanian-American Chamber of Commerce
Romanian-American Committee for private property
Romanian-American Network Inc. a Romanian heritage and cultural oasis in USA 
Romanian Business Professionals  is a non-profit organization with a membership that adheres to three primary objectives: networking and mutual support; learning/advancement of the members; Impacting the Romanian community (primarily in the US)

Health care 
Romanian Medical Society of New York

Culture
Romanian-American Congress
Romanian Folk Art Museum and Gift Gallery
Romanian Student Club of Illinois
League of Romanian Societies of America
Maryhill Museum of Art
Round Table Society NFP, Chicago, IL
Organization of Romanian Americans (ORA) Carmichael, CA
Romanian American Society of Washington State, Seattle, WA
American Romanian Cultural Society; Seattle, WA
Romanian American National Heritage Award; USA

News
Romanian Tribune newspaper published in Chicago in Romanian language for this ethnic group living in United States
Nine O'Clock, Daily English language Romanian newspaper
Gandacul de Colorado, Romanian newspaper in USA
Romanian - American classified ads portal
Radio27online.com 
Global Connect Network Inc.(GCN, GCNTV) Romanian IPTV, WebTv and Satellite TV company, providing Romanian TV channels to Romanians living in Canada and United States. http://www.gcntv.net

Religion
The Romanian Orthodox Monastery of Detroit, Romanian Orthodox monastery situated in the north of Detroit
Romanian-Christian Music Association
Romanian Orthodox Episcopate of America, Romanian administration for the Romanian-Orthodox parishes of USA
Romanian Orthodox Parishes of USA and Canada, directory of Romanian Orthodox parishes in North America

References

External links
Online portal for Romanians living in the Chicago area
Romanian Tribune newspaper published in Chicago in Romanian language for this ethnic group living in United States

Romanian-American history